The Pashto alphabet is a version of Perso-Arabic script used to write the Pashto language.

Form

Pashto is written in the Arabic Naskh. Pashto uses all 28 letters of the Arabic alphabet, and shares 3 letters (چ, پ, and ژ) with Persian in the additional letters.

Differences from Persian alphabet 

Pashto has several letters which do not appear in any other Perso-Arabic scripts, which are shown in the table below:

All the additional characters are derived from existing Arabic letters by adding diacritics; for example, the consonants x̌īn/ṣ̌īn and ǵe/ẓ̌e look like Arabic's sīn and re respectively with a dot above and beneath. Similarly, note that the letters representing retroflex consonants are written with a small circle (known as a "panḍak", "ğaṛwanday" or "skəṇay") attached underneath the corresponding dental consonants.

The consonant  is written as either ګ or گ.

In addition to Persian vowels, Pashto has ئ, ې, ۀ, and ۍ for additional vowels and diphthongs.

Stress 

Pashto employs stress: this can change the aspect of the verb and the meaning of the word. The Arabic alphabet does not show stress placement, but in transliteration it is indicated by the use of acute accent diactric:  over the vowel.

Example

Letters
Pashto has 45 letters and 4 diacritic marks. The Southern (S), Northeastern (NE) and Northwestern (NW) dialects of Pashto are included.

Notes
  At the beginning of a word, آ (alif with madda) represents the long vowel  in words borrowed from other languages (e.g.  آغا  – āğā́, a title). At the beginning of a word, the letter ا (alif) represents the vowel , e.g. اسپه – áspa, "mare". In the middle or end of a word, ا represents the long vowel  which is following a consonant (e.g. کال – kāl, "year"; and نيا – nyā, "grandmother"). At the beginning of a word, the letter alif can also be used with a diactric mark [often not written] e.g. اِ (alif with a zer) as in اِسلام – Islām, "Islam (the religion)".
  Ten letters, ق ف ع ظ ط ض ص ح ﺫ ث, appear only in loanwords of Arabic origin borrowed through Persian. Eight of these, ع ظ ط ض ص ح ﺫ ث, represent no additional phonemes of Pashto, and their pronunciation is replaced with other phonemes.
  The letter ړ represents  
  The phoneme  ف occurs only in loanwords. It tends to be replaced with  پ.
  The phoneme  ق occurs only in loanwords. It tends to be replaced with  ک.
  It is also common to write the letter ک as ك.
  In informal texts, ی as well as ې are sometimes replaced by the letter ے, especially in Khyber Pakhtunkhwa.
  ی represents  when it is following a consonant (e.g. لرګی – , "wood"), and represents  when it is following a vowel (e.g. دوی – duy, "they").
  The letter ئ represents  after a vowel, e.g. جدائي – judāyi, "separation".
  It is also common to write ﺉ with the hamza over the right side of the letter – ٸ.
  The letter ۀ is only represented at the end of a word, e.g. تېرۀ – terə́, "sharp". The vowel , when present between consonants, is not represented by the letter ۀ, but instead is omitted, e.g. ننوتل  – nənawatə́l, "to enter".
  Some dialects also omit the letter غ in some words, e.g. consider the following words; دغه = دا، دغوی = دوی، دغه هومره = دومره، دغلته = دلته، هغلته = هلته، دغه سی = داسی
  The nasalised vowel / ̃/ appears in certain dialects such as Banisi/Banuchi and Waṇetsi. It is represented with ں e.g. بويں –buĩ "smell" [in these dialects].

Historical letters
The superscribed element of the letter  in earlier varieties was not hamza-shaped, but was very similar to little kāf of the letter . Such shape of the upper element of the letter is hard to find in modern fonts.

Diacritic marks

The four diacritic marks are used:

Notes
 The diacritic marks are not considered separate letters. Their use is optional and are usually not written; they are only occasionally used to distinguish between two words which would otherwise appear similar, like the words ملا - back (body part) and مُلا - Mullah.
 In Arabic loanwords, the tanwin fatha can be used, e.g.  – masalan, "for example".

"Ye" letters

Notes
If the letter follows a consonant in a word, it indicates the word is masculine singular and in the direct case. At the end of verbs it is used to form verbal participle in the masculine.
  If    ends a word it always indicates that the word it occurs in is feminine.
  If  occurs at the end of a verb, it indicates the verb is in second person plural form. 
If   appears at end of nouns and adjectives  it indicates that those are feminine. At the end of verbs it is used as verbal suffix and to form verbal participle in the feminine. It also ends certain circumpositions.
 If    occurs at the end of a verb, it indicates the verb is in third person plural present form. At the end of nouns and adjectives it indicates that the word is masculine in the singular oblique case, plural direct case. It also used in the non-declining adjective class.

Orthography differences 
There are broadly two standards for Pashto orthography, the Afghan orthography, which is regulated by the Academy of Sciences of Afghanistan, and the Peshawar orthography of the Pashto Academy in Peshawar. They used to be very similar in the past, until the orthography reforms were introduced in 1970s and 80s in Afghanistan. Both of them use additional letters: . The Afghan standard is currently dominant due to the lack and negative treatment of Pashto education in Pakistan. Most writers use mixed orthography combining elements of both standards. In Pakistan, Pashto speakers who are not literate in their mother tongue often use  Urdu  alphabets.

The main differences between the two are as follows:

Word-final -y sound is denoted by  letter in Pakistan and dotless  letter in Afghanistan. Word-final -i sound is denoted by  letter in both Pakistan and Afghanistan. Pre-reform Afghan orthography used  for both cases, and some writers still often confuse them.

Afghan orthography uses  for both sounds.

Most Arabic script fonts, however, only implement a form of  that looks like  with a circle.

In practice, however, even the official sources often use the  form. In Unicode they are split into two separate glyphs.

Pre-reform Afghan orthography also used .

  Also  yāst in Southern Pashto.

Pakistani orthography uses  for the postposition kx̌e "in". Afghan standard prefers . In most dialects, this postposition is pronounced ke or ki, but the historical pronunciation, also found as a variant in some Southern Pashto dialects, is kṣ̌e. The verbal prefix  (as in  kenastəl or kṣ̌enastəl "to sit down") is still pronounced kṣ̌e- in Southern Pashto and ke- in Northern Pashto, but some Afghan authors may also spell it like . On the other hand, words with  combination, like  nәxṣ̌a "mark, sign",  bәxṣ̌әl "forgive, pardon", are written identically according to both standards, but some authors speaking Northern Pashto may write them according to their pronunciation:  nәxa,  bәxәl.

In some auxiliary words like pronouns and particles, as well as in plural and oblique singular forms of feminine nouns, the Pakistani orthography uses , while the Afghan orthography often uses . It reflects the pronunciation of unstressed word-final -e in some Afghan dialects, particularly the Kandahari accent. Note also that the pronoun "you" is usually written  tāso in Pakistan, reflecting the local dialects. In Afghanistan, this pronoun is written  tāsi or  tāso. In verbal prefixes like  pre-,  kṣ̌e-/ke-, both standards use .

The auxiliary verb  in passive constructions is often written without a space with the copula in the Afghan orthography. E.g.,  likәle šәwe da "is (fem.) written" may be spelled  by some authors.

The potential/optative participles are written with  -āy in Afghanistan (e.g.  likəlāy "able to write"), and with  -ay in Pakistan ( likəlay). These participles are pronounced with -āy in Southern Pashto of Kandahar, but even the Kabuli writers who pronounce them with -ay use  -āy to distinguish them from the past participles (\ likəlay "written").

In both modern orthographies, matres lectionis ( for o and u,  for i) should always be written in native Pashto words. The borrowed words should be written the way they were in the original languages:  bulbul "nightingale",  or  gul "flower".

The phrase pә xayr "welcome", lit. "well, successfully" is written in two words in Afghanistan, but often as a single word in Pakistan.

The Afghan orthography does not use a space in compound and suffixed words, while in Peshawar standard the letters should be disconnected without a space. The zero-width non-joiner is used in such cases.

The archaic orthography may also be used  in certain texts, before standardisation.

  In different dialects, "we" and its derivatives are pronounced  mung or  mug/muẓ̌. Both types are found in Pakistan and Afghanistan, but the Afghan tradition prefers  after the Kandahari pronunciation.

Peshawar and Afghan standards also differ in the way they spell Western loanwords. Afghan spellings are influenced by Persian/Dari orthography, and through it often borrows French and German forms of the words, while Pakistani orthography is influenced by Urdu spellings of English words.

History

In the 16th century, Bayazid Pir Roshan from Waziristan invented the Roshani script to write Pashto. It had 41 letters:

28 of his letters came from the Arabic alphabet. He introduced 13 new letters into the Pashto alphabet. Most of the new letters he introduced i.e.  and ڼ are still written in the same form and are pronounced almost in the same way in modern Pashto. The sound system of the southern dialect of modern Pashto preserves the distinction between all the consonant phonemes of his orthography.

Pir Roshan also introduced the letter ږ (rē with dot below and dot above) to represent , like the ⟨s⟩ in pleasure, for which modern Pashto uses ژ instead. Modern Pashto uses the letter ږ to represent the sound , but for that sound, Pir Roshan used a letter looking like ·د (dāl with central dot). His letter ڊ (dāl with dot below) to represent  has been replaced by ځ in modern Pashto. He also used ڛ (sīn with three dots below), an obsolete letter from the medieval Nastaʿlīq script, to denote the letter س (representing ) only in the isolated form. The Arabic ligature ﻻ (lām-alif) was also used. Two of his letters, پ and چ, were borrowed from the Persian alphabet.

Romanisation
The following table (read from left to right) gives the letters' isolated forms, along with possible Latin equivalents and typical IPA values:

Dialect vowels 

Waziristani has the following vowels:

These can potentially be romanised as: 

In the Marwat dialect and in the Karlāṇi dialects presence of nasalised vowels has been noted. As such the nasalised vowels be transcribed in the following ways:

It can also be transcribed as:

Pashto Keyboards

Pashto Roman Keyboard  for macOS [Guide: download; Installation Guide
 Pashto phonetic keyboard online

See also 
 Pre-Islamic scripts in Afghanistan

Notes 
1. As 2nd Person Singular - example: ته کور ته ځې [you are going home]. And as Past Feminine 3rd Person Plural - example: هغوی ګډېدې [They (women) were dancing)
2. Example: پرې,  پې, تر...پورې etc
3.  Example: سړی تللی و [the man had gone]
4.  Example: خځه تللې وه [the woman had gone]

References

Bibliography 
 Awde & Sarwan (2002). "Pashto dictionary & phrasebook", page 24.

External links
 khyber.org
pcgn.org.uk (PDF)
loc.gov (PDF)
abnea.com (PDF)
eki.ee (PDF)
Pashto English-English Pashto Dictionary Phrasebook Romanized (Nicholas Awde)

Arabic alphabets
Pashto
Arabic alphabets for South Asian languages